Auguste Pellerin (20 February 1853, Paris - 18 October 1929, Neuilly-sur-Seine) was a French entrepreneur and art collector. He was one of the most important collectors of the works of Édouard Manet and Paul Cézanne at the beginning of the 20th century.

Life 
Auguste Pellerin attained his fortune through margarine manufacturing. His successful enterprise included factories in France, England, Germany, Denmark, Sweden, and Norway. From 1906 until his death in 1929 he also acted as Norwegian General Consul in Paris.

At first, Pellerin collected craft objects such as porcelain, faience, and glass. He soon began to collect works by established painters such as Antoine Vollon und Jean Jacques Henner. Paintings by Jean-Baptiste-Camille Corot and the Impressionists followed. At this point he focused on Édouard Manet, buying many major works by that artist. In 1898 he acquired his first Cézanne from Ambroise Vollard. Over the years he accumulated a notable collection of more than 90 works by these artists. Pellerin became personally acquainted with some of these artists, including Cézanne, who sketched his portrait in 1899. Two further portraits were painted by Henri Matisse around 1916-17.

On 2 February 1910, 35 of Pellerin's Manets were sold for 1,000,000 francs to a consortium of art dealers that included Bernheim-Jeune, Durand-Ruel, and Paul Cassirer, a move that stirred controversy. Many of these paintings, which through Heinrich Thannhauser were exhibited in the Moderne Galerie in Munich, were later sold to German collectors and eventually ended up in German museums. Although Pellerin sold more of his collection during his lifetime, his son Jean-Victor Pellerin and his daughter still inherited a substantial number of paintings, drawings, and sculptures. In 1982 his heirs gave 14 of the most important Cézanne paintings in the remaining collection to French state museums.

Selection of works from the Pellerin collection

Citations

References 
 Emil Waldmann: Édouard Manet in der Sammlung Pellerin in Kunst und Künstler 8/1909-1910, p. 387-398.
 Josef Kern: Impressionismus im Wilhelinischen Deutschland. Königshausen  Neumann, Würzburg 1989, .
 Anne Distel: Impressionism, The First Collectors. Harry N Abrams, New York 1990, .
 Catherine Krahmer (Ed.): Kunst ist nicht für Kunstgeschichte da, Briefe und Dokumente. Wallstein, Göttingen 2002, .
 Andreas Hollezcek (Ed.): Französische Kunst - Deutsche Perspektiven 1870 - 1945, Quellen und Kommentare zur Kunstkritik. Akademie Verlag, Berlin 2004, .

External links 
 Portrait of Auguste Pellerin by Henri Matisse, 1917

1853 births
1929 deaths
Art collectors from Paris